The election of a mock mayor is British folk tradition found in a number of communities throughout the British Isles. A mock mayor is an individual who is elected by a popular informal assembly of individuals as a parody of the official office of mayor in any given community.

Examples

Examples may be found in:

Cornwall
 Helston (known as the Mayor of St Johns)
 Mylor
 Penzance, as part of the Golowan Festival
 Polperro
 St Germans

Elsewhere
 Abingdon-on-Thames, Oxfordshire. (Known as the Mayor of Ock Street)
 Barton, Gloucestershire.
 Llansteffan, Wales.
 Newcastle-under-Lyme, Staffordshire.
 Woodstock, Oxfordshire.

See also 

Lord of Misrule

References

External links 
The Mock Mayor of Mylor
The Mayor of the Quay Penzance and Golowan Traditions.
The Mayor of St Germans
The Mock Mayor of St John's Helston

British traditions
Mayors of places in the United Kingdom
Cornish culture